George William Hope (4 July 1808 – 18 October 1863), was a British Tory politician. He served as Under-Secretary of State for War and the Colonies under Sir Robert Peel from 1841 to 1846.

Background and education
Hope was the son of the Honourable Sir Alexander Hope, fourth son of John Hope, 2nd Earl of Hopetoun. His mother was Georgiana Alicia Brown, daughter of George Brown. He was educated at Harrow.

Political career
Hope was returned to Parliament for Weymouth and Melcombe Regis in 1837. When the Tories came to power under Sir Robert Peel in 1841, Hope was appointed Under-Secretary of State for War and the Colonies, a post he held until the fall of the government in 1846. In 1842 he was returned for Southampton, a seat he lost in 1847. He remained out of parliament until 1859, when he was returned for Windsor, a seat he represented until his death four years later.

Family

Hope married the Honourable Caroline Georgiana Montagu-Scott, daughter of Henry Montagu-Scott, 2nd Baron Montagu of Boughton, in 1836. They had several children, including Sir Edward Stanley Hope, a Lunacy Commissioner, and Sir Herbert James Hope (1851-1930), Bankruptcy Registrar. Hope died at Luffness in October 1863, aged 55. Caroline Hope died in December 1891. She is buried in Aberlady churchyard in East Lothian.

References

External links

1808 births
1863 deaths
George William
People educated at Harrow School
Members of the Parliament of the United Kingdom for English constituencies
Tory MPs (pre-1834)
UK MPs 1837–1841
UK MPs 1841–1847
UK MPs 1859–1865
Scottish barristers
Members of the Bar of England and Wales